15811 Nüsslein-Volhard, provisional designation , is a dark background asteroid from the outer region of the asteroid belt, approximately 16 kilometers in diameter. It was discovered on 10 July 1994, by German astronomer Freimut Börngen at the Karl Schwarzschild Observatory in Tautenburg, Germany. It was named for Nobelist Christiane Nüsslein-Volhard.

Orbit and classification 

Nüsslein-Volhard orbits the Sun in the outer main-belt at a distance of 2.7–3.7 AU once every 5 years and 9 months (2,095 days). Its orbit has an eccentricity of 0.17 and an inclination of 10° with respect to the ecliptic.

Physical characteristics 

According to the observations made by the Infrared Astronomical Satellite IRAS and NASA's Wide-field Infrared Survey Explorer with its subsequent NEOWISE mission, Nüsslein-Volhard measures 15.2 and 16.2 kilometers in diameter, and its surface has an albedo of 0.062 and 0.067, respectively. A low albedo of 0.06 is typical for carbonaceous asteroids.

Lightcurve 

As of 2017, Nüsslein-Volhards actual composition, rotation period and shape remain unknown.

Naming 

This minor planet was named after Christiane Nüsslein-Volhard (born 1942), a German biologist who, together with Eric Wieschaus and Edward Lewis, won the Nobel Prize in Physiology or Medicine in 1995. Her research identified the genes controlling the embryonic development for the fruit fly Drosophila melanogaster. The approved naming citation was published by the Minor Planet Center on 26 May 2002.

References

External links 
 Asteroid Lightcurve Database (LCDB), query form (info )
 Dictionary of Minor Planet Names, Google books
 Asteroids and comets rotation curves, CdR – Observatoire de Genève, Raoul Behrend
 Discovery Circumstances: Numbered Minor Planets (15001)-(20000) – Minor Planet Center
 
 

015811
Discoveries by Freimut Börngen
Named minor planets
19940710